Signakh may refer to:

Sığnaq, Azerbaijan
Signakh uezd, county of the Russian empire, in modern-day Georgia
Sighnaghi (alternate spelling Signakh), Georgia, in Signakh uezd